

Denmark
Danish West Indies – Johan Frederik Bardenfleth, Governor-General of the Danish West Indies (1821–1827) 
Iceland – Peter Fjeldsted Hoppe, Governor of Iceland (1824–1829)
North Greenland – Carl Peter Holbøll, Inspector of North Greenland (1825–1828)
South Greenland – Christian Alexander Platou, Inspector of South Greenland (1821–1823, 1824–1827)

France
French Guiana –
Charles Emmanuel de Muyssard, Governor of French Guiana (1825–1826)
Joseph Burgues de Missiessy, Governor of French Guiana (1826–1827)
Guadeloupe –
Louis Léon Jacob, Governor of Guadeloupe (1823–1826)
Jean Julien Angot des Rotours, Governor of Guadeloupe (1826–1830)
Martinique – 
François Xavier, Governor of Martinique (1818–1826)
François Marie Michel de Bouillé, Governor of Martinique (1826–1829)

The Netherlands
Aruba – 
Jacob Thielen, Commander (1822–1826)
Simon Plats, Commander (1826–1827)
Bonaire
Curaçao
Dutch East Indies
Surinam – Abraham de Veer, Governor-General of Surinam, (1822–1827)
Saba
Sint Eustatius
Sint Maarten

Portugal
Angola – Nicolau Aberu Castelo Branco, Governor of Angola (1823–1829)

Spanish Empire

Captaincy General of Cuba – Francisco Dionisio Vives, Governor of Cuba (1823–1832)
Captaincy General of Puerto Rico – Miguel de la Torre y Pando, conde de Torrepando, Governor of Puerto Rico (1822–1837)
Spanish East Indies – Mariano Ricafort Palacín y Abarca, Governor-General of the Philippines (1825–1830)
Viceroyalty of Peru – Juan Pío de Tristán y Moscoso, nominal (1824–1826)

United Kingdom
Antigua-Barbuda-Montserrat – 
Sir Benjamin D'Urban, Governor of Antigua (1819–1826)
Sir Patrick Ross, Governor of Antigua (1826–1832)
The Bahamas – Lewis Grant, Governor of the Bahamas (1821–1829)
Barbados – Sir Henry Warde, Governor of Barbados (1821–1829)
Berbice – Henry Beard, Lieutenant-Governor of Berbice (1821–1831)
Bermuda – 
William Smith, Acting Governor of Bermuda (1825–1826)
Sir Tomkyns Hilgrove Turner, Governor of Bermuda (1826–1832)
British Columbia – John McLoughlin, Governor of British Columbia (1825–1838, 1839–1845)
British North America – The Earl George Ramsay, Governor General of British North America (1820–1828)
Lower Canada – Sir Francis Nathaniel Burton, Lieutenant-Governor of Lower Canada (1820–1828)
New Brunswick – Sir Howard Douglas, Lieutenant-Governor of New Brunswick (1824–1831)
Nova Scotia – Sir James Kempt, Governor of Nova Scotia (1820–1828)
Prince Edward Island – John Ready, Governor of Prince Edward Island (1824–1831)
Upper Canada – Sir Peregrine Maitland, Lieutenant-Governor of Upper Canada, (1818–1828)
Demerara-Essequibo – Sir Benjamin D'Urban, Lieutenant-Governor of Demerara-Essequibo (1824–1831)
Dominica – William Nicolay, Governor of Dominica (1824–1831)
Grenada – 
George Paterson, Acting Lieutenant-Governor of Grenada (1823–1826)
James Campbell, Lieutenant-Governor of Grenada (1826–1833)
Jamaica (with Belize) – The Duke William Montague, Governor of Jamaica (1808–1827)
Malta Colony
Francis Rawdon-Hastings, Governor of Malta (1824–1826)
Alexander George Woodford, Acting Governor of Malta (1826–1827)
New South Wales – Lieutenant-General Ralph Darling, Governor of New South Wales (1825–1831)
Newfoundland – Sir Thomas John Cochrane, Governor of Newfoundland and Labrador (1825–1834)
Red River Colony – Donald Mackenzie, Governor of the Red River Colony (1825–1833)
Rupert's Land – Sir John Henry Pelly, Governor of the Hudson's Bay Company (1822–1852)
St. Christopher-Nevis-Anguilla-British Virgin Islands – Charles William Maxwell, Governor (1821–1832)
St. Lucia – 
Nathaniel Shepherd Blackwell, Governor of St. Lucia (1824–1826)
John Montagu Mainwaring, Governor of St. Lucia (1821–1824, 1826–1827)
St. Vincent – Charles Brisbane, Governor of St. Vincent (1808–1829)
Tobago – Sir Frederick Philipse Robinson, Governor of Tobago (1816–1827)
Trinidad – Sir Ralph James Woodford, Governor of Trinidad (1813–1828)

Colonial governors
Colonial governors
1826